Slovenian singer and songwriter Senidah has released two studio albums, 25 singles (including two as a featured artist), 23 music videos and three promotional singles.

Albums

Studio albums

Singles

As lead artist

As featured artist

Promotional singles

Songwriting credits

Music videos

References

Hip hop discographies
Slovenian music
Discographies of Slovenian artists